The 1983 ECAC South men's basketball tournament (now known as the Colonial Athletic Association men's basketball tournament) was held March 10–12 at the Robins Center in Richmond, Virginia. The champion, James Madison, received an automatic bid to the 1983 NCAA tournament; it was JMU's third-ever NCAA Tournament berth. The runner-up, William & Mary, received an at-large bid to the 1983 National Invitation Tournament; it was W&M's first-ever postseason berth of any kind.

Seeds

Bracket

Awards and honors
Tournament MVP
Derek Steele, James Madison

All-Tournament Team
Keith Cieplicki, William & Mary
Charles Green, East Carolina
Kevin Richardson, William & Mary
Dan Ruland, James Madison
Derek Steele, James Madison

References

Colonial Athletic Association men's basketball tournament
Tournament
ECAC South men's basketball tournament
ECAC South men's basketball tournament
College basketball tournaments in Virginia
Basketball competitions in Richmond, Virginia